Holy Sepulchre Cemetery may refer to:

United States
Holy Sepulchre Cemetery (Worth, Illinois)
Holy Sepulchre Cemetery (East Orange, New Jersey)
Holy Sepulchre Cemetery (Cheltenham Township, Pennsylvania)
Holy Sepulchre Cemetery (New Rochelle, New York)
Holy Sepulchre Cemetery (Coram, New York)
Holy Sepulchre Cemetery (Rochester, New York)
Holy Sepulchre Cemetery (Totowa, New Jersey)
Holy Sepulchre Cemetery (Southfield, Michigan)
Holy Sepulchre Cemetery (Hayward, California)

United Kingdom
 St Sepulchre's Cemetery, Oxford, England